Aroostook may refer to:

 Aroostook Band of Micmacs, a tribe of Mi'kmaq people in Aroostook County, Maine U.S.
 Aroostook, New Brunswick, Canada
 Aroostook County, Maine, U.S.
 Aroostook River, in Maine
 Aroostook War, an 1838–1839 boundary dispute between the British colony of New Brunswick and the U.S. state of Maine
 USS Aroostook

See also